You Am I are an Australian rock band, formed in 1989.

You Am I may also refer to:
 You Am I (album), their eponymous 2010 studio album
 You Am I (film), a 2006 Lithuanian romance film

See also
 I Am You (disambiguation)
 You and I (disambiguation)